Louis E. Destremps was a Canadian-born American architect who designed several notable buildings in the New Bedford, Massachusetts area. Among his most notable works are the Orpheum Theatre and Star Store. He was the son of architect Louis G. Destremps, who primarily practiced in Fall River, Massachusetts.

Early life and career
Destremps was born on June 9, 1875, in Montreal, Quebec, Canada. He later lived in New York City where he received his early education. His family later moved to Fall River, Massachusetts where his father established his firm. Destremps joined his father's firm at age eighteen, where he worked for four years before moving to Newport, Rhode Island, joining the firm of Andrews & Withers. Destremps also later worked in that firm's New York office.

Destremps married Antonia Latrobe of Pittsfield, Massachusetts on June 16, 1897. They had three children together.

In 1905, Destremps moved to New Bedford and established his own office in the Masonic Building. He soon established himself as one of the area's premier architects. During this period, his designs included numerous public and private buildings, including the Orpheum Theatre, the Star Store Building, and several school buildings in New Bedford.

In 1919 his practice was succeeded by LaBrode & Bullard, the partnership of Leo L. LaBrode and Egbert G. Bullard.

Works include
Star Store, New Bedford, Massachusetts
Orpheum Theatre, 1912, New Bedford, Massachusetts
Union Street Railway Carbarn, New Bedford, Massachusetts
Elks Building, New Bedford, Massachusetts
Third District Court Building
Winslow School
Lincoln School
Jireh Swift School

References

1875 births
Year of death missing
Architects from Montreal
Canadian emigrants to the United States
People from Fall River, Massachusetts
19th-century American architects
20th-century American architects
Architects from Massachusetts